Cookies and cream (or cookies 'n cream) is a variety of ice cream, milkshake and other desserts that includes chocolate sandwich cookies, with the most popular version containing hand or pre-crumbled cookies from Nabisco's Oreo brand under a licensing agreement. Cookies and cream ice cream generally mixes in crumbled chocolate sandwich cookies into vanilla ice cream, though variations exist which might instead use chocolate, coffee or mint ice cream.

History
There are competing claims as to who first invented and marketed cookies and cream ice cream.

Malcolm Stogo, an ice cream consultant, claimed to have created the flavor in 1976, 1977 or 1978.
South Dakota State University claims the flavor was invented at the university's dairy plant in 1979 by plant manager Shirley Seas and students Joe Leedom and Joe Van Treeck.
In a 2005 press release, Blue Bell Creameries claimed they were the first company to mass-produce the flavor, in 1980. In 2006, The New York Times reported that Blue Bell made "no claim to have invented it but certainly pioneered the flavor." However, as of 2020, the company's website proclaimed, "We were first to create this innovative flavor." Blue Bell Creameries applied to register the trademark "Cookies 'n Cream" in 1981.
John Harrison, the official taster for Dreyer's/Edy's Ice Cream, claims he invented it first for the company in 1982
Another claimant is Steve Herrell of Massachusetts' Herrell's Ice Cream.
In 1983, cookies and cream became one of the top five best-selling flavors of ice cream.

See also 
 Hershey's Cookies 'n' Creme

References

Flavors of ice cream
Vanilla ice cream